The West Cork League is an association football league featuring amateur and junior clubs from West Cork. Its top division, the PremierHiSpecCars.com Premier Division, is a seventh level division in the Republic of Ireland football league system. It is affiliated to both the Munster Football Association and the Football Association of Ireland.

History
The West Cork League was formed in 1978. Before 1978 clubs from West Cork, including Bandon A.F.C. and Clonakilty AFC, played in the Cork Athletic Union League. The founding members of the league included Crookstown, Castletown Celtic, Kileady, Ballinhassig, Our Ladies Hospital and Brinny. In 1990 discussions were held with the Cork Athletic Union League about a possible merger. However the two leagues could not agree. Between 1991 and 1993 the WCL was affiliated with the Munster Senior League. In 1992 Beamish began sponsoring the league. During the 1980s and 1990s membership of the league expanded and by 1997 the WCL featured approximately twenty three clubs. In addition schoolboy, under–18 and ladies leagues were added in the 1990s. The current Ladies League was revived in 2004–05 after a period of inactivity. Drinagh Rangers have been the most successful club since the turn of the century, winning 9 Premier Division titles (and finishing in the top 2 on 14 occasions) and 4 Beamish Cups, with the clubs B team also winning the Division 2 title in the 2018–19 season and 2019-20 season.

Representative team
In 2005–06 the West Cork League representative team reached the final of the Oscar Traynor Cup but lost 5-0 to the Athletic Union League (Dublin). In 2015 the West Cork League representative team featured Cork GAA player Colm O'Driscoll.

2020-21 teams
Premier HiSpecCars.com Premier Division        
Ballydehob
Clonakilty Soccer Club
Drinagh Rangers
Dunmanway Town
Durrus
Lyre Rovers
Mizen AFC
Riverside Athletic
Spartak Mossgrove
Togher Celtic

List of winners

Premier Division

Division 1

Division 2

Beamish Cup

Number of Trophies Won By Club

The following list displays the number of trophies won by each West Cork club since the turn of the century:

Notes

References 

7
Association football leagues in Munster
Association football in County Cork
1978 establishments in Ireland
Sports leagues established in 1978